María José Martínez Sánchez and Anabel Medina Garrigues were the defending champions, but neither competed this year.

Tathiana Garbin and Angelique Widjaja won the title by defeating Elena Bovina and Henrieta Nagyová 7–5, 3–6, 6–4 in the final.

Seeds

Draw

Draw

References

External links
 Official results archive (ITF)
 Official results archive (WTA)

Croatian Bol Ladies Open - Doubles
Croatian Bol Ladies Open